Here I Am is the first extended play by South Korean singer, Yesung. It was released on April 19, 2016 by SM Entertainment and Label SJ, and distributed by KT Music.

Background and release
On April 12, 2016, S.M. Entertainment announced that Yesung would be releasing his first EP called Here I Am on April 19. On April 13, S.M. Entertainment revealed the album title track "Here I Am", produced by Brother Su and Yesung. On April 14, S.M. Entertainment released this album highlight medley video. On April 19, the title track "Here I Am" music video was released. Yesung made his solo debut stage on M Countdown on April 21.

Track listing

Chart performance

Album charts

Single charts
Here I Am

Other charted songs

Release history

References

External links
 Yesung's official website 

2016 EPs
EPs by South Korean artists
Korean-language EPs
SM Entertainment EPs